Morococha is a town in the Morococha District in the Yauli Province of the Junín Region in Peru. It was the capital of the Morococha District until September 12, 2013, when the town of Nueva Morococha (Spanish nuevo(a) new, "new Morococha") was established as the new capital of the district by Law No. 30081.

Morococha is near the city La Oroya.

Open pit mine
As of 2013, Morococha was the site of a planned open pit copper mine to be operated by Chinalco, a Chinese firm. A new town for the 5,000 residents of Morococha has been built about 6 miles away, but some residents were reported to be resisting location. The mine is projected to produce about 250,000 tons of copper a year for about 35 years.

Sports

Golf
Tuctu Golf Club

Notes

Cities in Peru